The European Charter for Researchers is a recommendation of good practice for researchers and employers and/or funders of researchers issued by the European Commission Directorate-General for Research. It sketches rights and duties of researchers and their funding institutions. It was published together with the Code of Conduct for the Recruitment of Researchers which outlines principles for hiring and appointing researchers. The document was compiled relying on extensive advice of researchers and research policy stakeholders. The European Commission described the European Charter for Researchers and the Code of Conduct for the Recruitment of Researchers as 'key elements in the European Union's policy to make research an attractive career, which is a vital feature of its strategy to stimulate economic and employment growth'. , 1000 European institutions had formally endorsed the charter, with little evidence for practical implementation.

General principles and requirements applicable to researchers in the charter 
 Intellectual freedom
 Adherence to recognised ethical practices
 Professional responsibility * Professional attitude (e.g. seeking necessary approvals before commencing research)
 Contractual and legal obligations (these should be fulfilled)
 Accountability (e.g. adhering to the principles of sound, transparent and efficient financial management)
 Good practice in research (e.g. reliable backing up of data)
 Dissemination and exploitation of results is promoted
 Public engagement is promoted
 Researchers should take advantage of available supervision in a structured way
 Senior researchers have a responsibility to manage and nurture younger researchers well
 Continual professional development is promoted

General principles and requirements applicable to employers and funders 
 Recognition of researchers as professionals on a career path (from postgraduate level upwards)
 Non-discrimination
 Research environment should be stimulating and safe
 Working conditions should be legal and flexible
 Stability and permanence of employment (implementing the principles of the EU Directive on Fixed-Term Work)
 Funding and salaries should be fair and attractive
 Gender balance ('employers and/or funders should aim for a representative gender balance at all levels of staff, including at supervisory and managerial level')
 Career development should be promoted
 Value of mobility should be recognised and promoted
 Access to research training and continuous development
 Access to career advice
 Intellectual property rights should be protected
 Co-authorship should be viewed positively
 Supervision should be provided for early stage researchers
 Teaching should be recognised as important, while not placing excessive burdens on researchers
 Evaluation/appraisal systems should be provided
 Complaints/appeals procedures should be provided
 Participation in decision-making bodies is promoted
 Recruitment should adhere to the Code of Conduct for the Recruitment of Researchers

Code of Conduct for the Recruitment of Researchers 
 Recruitment should be open, efficient and transparent
 Selection should be by balanced and trained panels
 Transparency of procedure for candidates
 Merit should be judged both qualitatively and quantitatively, balancing a good range of criteria
 Career breaks and other multidimensional career tracks should not be penalised
 Recognition of mobility experience
 Recognition of qualifications
 Seniority ('the levels of qualifications required should be in line with the needs of the position and not be set as a barrier to entry')
 Postdoctoral appointments should provide career development opportunities

Aim and implementation 
Given that legally the Charter and the Code are recommendations, the implementation of the documents was initially left to peer pressure. The Charter and the Code were described as serving as a quality certificate for research institutions. Where national or regional legislation gives researchers more favourable conditions than those provided by the Charter, the charter requested that the more favourable conditions not be diminished.

Implementation of the Researchers Charter was recommended not only by the European Commission, but also by research and science policy organisations including Eurodoc and Marie Curie Fellows Association.

See also 
 Directorate-General of the Joint Research Centre (European Commission)
 Directorate-General for Research (European Commission)

References

External links 
 European Charter for Researchers and the Code of Conduct for the Recruitment of Researchers
 List of undersigning organisations. Archived from the original on 3 March 2016. Retrieved 17 May 2019.

European Union and science and technology